The Kisfaludy Society (Hungarian: Kisfaludy Társaság) was a literary society in Pest, founded in 1836 and named after Károly Kisfaludy, who had died in 1830. It held monthly meetings and was a major force in Hungarian literary life, giving prizes, funding the collection of folk songs, and sponsoring the publication of works like Imre Madách's The Tragedy of Man. It dissolved in 1952.

Founding members

Directors
 András Fáy (the first director, 1837-1841)
 Ferenc Toldy (1841-1860, and from 1860 vice-chairman)
 János Arany (1860-1867, with József Eötvös as president and Pál Gregus as secretary)
 Zsigmond Kemény (1867-1876)
 Móric Lukács (1876-1879)
 Pál Gyulai (1879-1899, with Zsolt Beöthy as secretary from 1879, president 1900-1922)

Other members

A-Eg

Er-N

P-V

Bibliography
 Fischer, William: A Kisfaludy Társaság története a szabadságharcig ("The History of the Kisfaludy Society"), 1928.
 Kéky Louis: A százéves Kisfaludy Társaság ("The Kisfaludy Society Centennial"), 1936.

Hungarian writers' organisations
1836 establishments in the Austrian Empire
Organisations based in Budapest